Construction site safety is an aspect of construction-related activities concerned with protecting construction site workers and others from death, injury, disease or other health-related risks. Construction is an often hazardous, predominantly land-based activity where site workers may be exposed to various risks, some of which remain unrecognized. Site risks can include working at height, moving machinery (vehicles, cranes, etc.) and materials, power tools and electrical equipment, hazardous substances, plus the effects of excessive noise, dust and vibration. The leading causes of construction site fatalities are falls, electrocutions, crush injuries, and caught-between injuries.

Overview 
According to the International Labour Organization, construction has a disproportionately high rate of recorded accidents. In 2019, the ILO said the top causes of occupational fatalities on construction sites were falls, electrocution, crush injuries, and caught-between injuries. Although construction sites face significantly the same hazards, the rate of accidents varies in different regions and countries due to a variety of safety cultures and workers' behavioral safety.

Construction incurs more occupational fatalities than any other sector in both the United States and in the European Union. In the US in 2019, 1,061, or about 20%, of worker fatalities in private industry occurred in construction. Construction has about 6% of US workers, but 17% of the fatalities - the largest number of fatalities reported for any industry sector.

In the United Kingdom, the construction industry is responsible for 31% of fatalities at work and 10% of major workplace injuries. In South Africa there are 150 fatalities and approximately 400 injuries each year related to construction sites. In Brazil, the incidence rate for all occupational fatalities is 3.6 per 100,000. (Little to no information regarding construction fatalities could be found in Asia, South American, Africa, and the Antarctic.)  The chart below contains more countries and the rate of construction site fatalities.

Health disparities 
Approximately 1 in 4 construction workers did not have health insurance in 2018, more than double the uninsured rate among all U.S. workers. Almost half (48%) or 2 in 4 Hispanic construction workers were uninsured, more than triple that of their non-Hispanic counterparts (13%). Hispanics make up a sizeable portion of the construction workforce: in 2019, 30.4% of construction workers were Hispanic, compared to 17.7% of workers in all industries. Of great concern is that minority workers have a higher risk of suffering from occupational illness and injury. US labor laws that create barriers to organizing a union, immigration policies, unregulated, unsafe work places, lack of health insurance, misclassified workers who lose protections, being an essential worker, not having sick leave, distrust of the healthcare system, language barriers, and the cost of missing work are just some of the possible contributing factors to this health disparity.

Hazards

The leading safety hazards on construction sites include falls, being caught between objects, electrocutions, and being struck by objects. These hazards have caused injuries and deaths on construction sites throughout the world. Failures in hazard identification are often due to limited or improper training and supervision of workers. Areas where there is limited training include tasks in design for safety, safety inspection, and monitoring safety. Failure in any of these areas can result in an increased risk in exposing workers to harm in the construction environment.

Falls are the leading cause of injury in the construction industry, in particularly for elder and untrained construction workers. In the Occupational Safety and Health Administration (OSHA) Handbook (29 CFR) used by the United States, fall protection is needed in areas including but not limited to ramps, runways, and other walkways; excavations; hoist areas; holes; form-work; leading edge work; unprotected sides and edges; overhand bricklaying and related work; roofing; precast erection; wall openings; floor openings such as holes; residential construction; and other walking/working surfaces.  Other countries have regulations and guidelines for fall protections to prevent injuries and deaths.

Motor vehicle crashes are another major safety hazard on construction sites. It is important to be cautious while operating motor vehicles or equipment on the site. A motor vehicle should have a service brake system, emergency brake system, and a parking brake system. All vehicles must be equipped with an audible warning system if the operator chooses to use it. Vehicles must have windows and doors, power windshield wipers, and a clear view of site from the rear window.  All employees should be properly trained before using motor vehicles and equipment.

Employees on construction sites also need to be aware of dangers on the ground. Cables running across roadways were often seen until cable ramp equipment was invented to protect hoses and other equipment which had to be laid out. Another common hazard that workers may face is overexposure to heat and humidity in the environment. Overexertion in this type of weather can lead to serious heat-related illnesses such as heat stroke, heat exhaustion, and heat cramps. 

Noise is also an occupational hazard, a 2019 study found that construction sites had the highest noise levels when compared to several other industries. Other hazards found on construction site include asbestos, solvents, noise, and manual handling activities.

Infectious diseases 
According to BLS data, about 1 out of 12 construction workers are exposed to infectious diseases more than once a month. This could happen because, in general, many employees continue to work while sick. Scientists studying this topic have reviewed many studies and found that the percentage of people who report going to work while sick ranges from more than a third to nearly 100%. An estimated 8 million employees in the U.S. worked while infected during the 2009 H1N1 influenza epidemic, which likely caused infection of up to 7 million co-workers.

Infectious diseases that occur among construction workers include valley fever (in the southwestern U.S., including California), histoplasmosis (especially in the Ohio and Mississippi River valleys), silicotuberculosis, and tetanus.

Exposures from certain construction activities have been associated with an increased risk of death from infectious disease. A Swedish study of more than 300,000 male construction workers found increased mortality from pneumonia infection among workers exposed to inorganic dust, such as man-made mineral fibers, dust from cement, concrete, and quartz.

Infection prevention and control (IPC) plans should be considered as an important component of all construction site occupational safety and health plans. IPC guidelines are most successful with clear communication and mandatory training.

COVID-19 

Construction workers can potentially be exposed at work to the virus that causes COVID-19. It can spread from person to person through respiratory droplets produced when an infected person coughs, sneezes, or talks or by touching their nose, mouth, or eyes after touching surfaces contaminated with the virus.

Construction sites should implement safety measures to prevent the spread of infection. Industry-specific guidance documents for COVID-19 have been developed by various governmental and professional organizations. The CDC provides COVID-19 guidelines for construction workers. The CDC provides the following recommendations for the worksite: Limit close contact with others by maintaining a distance of six feet or wearing cloth face covering when this is difficult. Limit tool sharing. Clean and disinfect surfaces at the beginning and end of your shift and throughout the day. Surfaces that need cleaning include shared tools, machines, vehicles, equipment, handrails, ladders, doorknobs, and portable toilets.

COVID-19 does not affect all people in the same manner. Workers over age 65 and those who have diabetes or chronic heart and lung conditions are more vulnerable to serious illness from COVID-19 infection, as are black and Hispanic workers. The State Health Department of New York reported that early data showed the Hispanic population was most impacted by the COVID-19 outbreak, followed by African Americans. Nationwide, hospitalization rates for COVID-19 are highest among Native Americans, followed by Hispanic or Latino persons who are 4 times more likely to than non-Hispanic whites to be hospitalized from COVID-19. Black Americans are also highly impacted by COVID-19. They make up 13 percent of the U.S. population and account for 30 percent of COVID-19 cases.

In 2019, nearly 60% of the construction work force had at least one COVID-19 risk factor (age 65+, medical condition, or others) for higher risk of severe illness from COVID-19. About 1.4 million or 12.3% of construction workers were age 60 or older. One in five (19.7%) construction workers had a respiratory disease, and one in four (25.8%) had cancer, diabetes, or heart, kidney, or liver disease. About 30% of construction workers were Hispanic who make up 17.7% of workers in all industries.

The NIOSH National Construction Center (CPWR) has developed a COVID-19 Construction Clearinghouse with a vast array of COVID-19 resources, developed specifically for the construction industry. Additional resources can be found at the bottom of this page and workplace hazard controls for COVID-19.

Road construction
The American Recovery and Reinvestment Act of 2009 created over 12,600 road construction projects, over 10,000 of which were in progress as of 2010. Workers in highway work zones are exposed to a variety of hazards and face risk of injury and death from construction equipment as well as passing motor vehicles. Workers on foot are exposed to passing traffic, often at high speeds, while workers who operate construction vehicles are at risk of injury due to overturn, collision, or being caught in running equipment. Regardless of the task assigned, construction workers work in conditions in poor lighting, poor visibility, inclement weather, congested work areas, high volume traffic and speeds. In 2011, there were a total of 119 fatal occupation fatalities in road construction sites.  In 2010 there were 37,476 injuries in work zones; about 20,000 of those were to construction workers.  Causes of road work site injuries included being struck by objects, trucks or mobile equipment (35%), falls or slips (20%), overexertion (15%), transportation incidents (12%), and exposure to harmful substances or environments (5%). Causes of fatalities included getting hit by trucks (58%), mobile machinery (22%), and automobiles (13%).

Road construction safety remains a priority among workers.  Several states have implemented campaigns addressing construction zone dangers and encouraging motorists to use caution when driving through work zones.

National Work Zone Safety Awareness Week is held yearly.  The national event began in 1999 and has gained popularity and media attention each year since.  The purpose of the event is to draw national attention to motorist and worker safety issues in work zones.

Hazard controls 
Site preparation aids in preventing injury and death on construction sites. Site preparation includes removing debris, leveling the ground, filling holes, cutting tree roots, and marking gas, water, and electric pipelines.  Another prevention method on the construction site is to provide a scaffold that is rigid and sufficient to carry its own weight plus four times the maximum intended load without settling or displacement.

Ways to prevent injuries and improve safety include:

 Management safety
 Integrate safety as a part of the job
 Design a safety management system and setup KPIs 
 Apply technology to help overall site monitoring
 Create accountability at all levels
 Take safety into account during the project planning process
 Make sure the contractors are pre-qualified for safety
 Make sure the workers are properly trained in appropriate areas
 Have a fall protection system
 Prevent and address substance abuse to employees
 Review accidents and near misses, as well as regular inspections
 Innovative safety training, e.g. adoption of virtual reality in training
 Replace some of the works by robots (many workers may worry that this will decrease their employment rate)
 Adoption of BIM with three dimensional printing to make the building model first before put into real practice

The employees or employers are responsible for providing fall protection systems and to ensure the use of systems. Fall protection can be provided by guardrail systems, safety net systems, personal fall arrest systems, positioning device systems, and warning line systems. Making sure that ladders are long enough to safely reach the work area to prevent injury. Stairway, treads, and walkways must be free of dangerous objects, debris and materials. A  registered professional engineer should design a protective system for trenches 20 feet deep or greater for safety reasons. To prevent injury with cranes, they should be inspected for any damage. The operator should know the maximum weight of the load that the crane is to lift. All operators should be trained and certified to ensure that they operate forklifts safely.

There are multiple digital tools that can be implemented to monitor over all site safety- including online inductions to construction sites, a digital site log, online construction site safety measurement and digital access control. Digital software keeps all construction inspections in one place and provides a permanent safety record for reporting purposes to help ensure job sites and equipment are safe. It is estimated, that construction companies save $4-$6 for every $1 spent on safety programs. Still, companies typically spend more of their budgets on injuries rather than safety training. Digital safety programs therefore provide an excellent opportunity for the construction industry.

Operational Excellence Model to improve safety for construction organizations

There are 16 safety drivers associated with this model to improve safety for construction organizations:

 Recognition & Reward
 Employee Engagement
 Subcontractor Management
 Training & Competence
 Risk Awareness, Management & Tolerance
 Learning Organization
 Human Performance
 Transformational Leadership
 Shared Values, Beliefs, and Assumptions
 Strategic Safety Communication
 Just & Fair Practices and Procedures
 Worksite Organization
 Owner's Role
 Digital transformation
 Knowledge transfer management
 Automation process

Each safety driver mentioned above has some sub-elements attributed to it.

Construction safety knowledge sharing 
Construction safety knowledge is now shared via social media. Knowledge sharing via Twitter has become one of the means. As an informal channel of knowledge dissemination, the processing and storage of massive amounts of knowledge puts high demands on opinion leaders. Organizations and governments tend to initiate and engage with their followers through social media. To have an active Twitter account, the first step is to establish its media presence, then attract followers to retweet. The opinion leaders related to construction safety Tweets were mostly organizations or government agencies. It is clear that the public still have a high recognition of the official or authoritative persons on the topic of construction safety. However, positive or negative sentiments did not significantly affect users’ retweeting activity. The information flow in the clusters relied almost entirely on the opinion leader itself.

Education and safety 
 
 
Construction workers need to be properly trained and educated on the task or job before working, which will assist in preventing injuries and deaths. There are many methods of training construction workers. One method is coaching construction site foremen to include safety in their daily verbal exchanges with workers to reduce work-related accidents. It is important that the workers use the same language to assure the best communication. In recent years, apart from traditional face to face safety knowledge sharing, mobile apps also make knowledge sharing possible.

Another method is ensuring that all workers know how to properly use electronics, conveyors, skid-steer, trucks, aerial lifts, and other equipment on the construction site. Equipment on the job site must be properly maintained and inspected regularly before and after each shift. The equipment inspection system will help the operator make sure that a machine is mechanically sound and in safe operating conditions. An employee should be assigned to inspect equipment to insure proper safety. Equipment should have lights and reflectors if intended for night use.  The glass in the cab of the equipment must be safety glass in some countries. The equipment must be used for its intended task at all times on the job site to insure workers' safety.

Each construction site should have a construction site manager. This is an occupational health and safety specialist who designs and implements safety regulations to minimize injuries and accidents. He or she also is in charge of conducting daily safety audits and inspections to ensure compliance with government regulations. Most construction site managers have an entry level experience or higher degree.

Before any excavation takes place, the contractor is responsible for notifying all applicable companies that excavation work is being performed. During excavation, the contractor is responsible for providing a safe work environment for employees and pedestrians.

Access and egress are also important parts of excavation safety. Ramps used by equipment must be designed by a person qualified in structural design. No person is allowed to cross underneath or stand underneath any loading or digging equipment. Employees are to remain at a safe distance from all equipment while it is operational. Employees who have training and education in the above areas will benefit their co-workers and themselves on the construction site.

National Safety Stand Down 
Every spring in the United States, many safety organizations sponsor a voluntary week-long campaign to raise awareness about falls in construction, the leading cause of death for construction workers. This event provides employers the opportunity to discuss safety hazards such as falls and how to prevent them. Even if a company doesn't have employees exposed to fall hazards, the safety awareness campaign can still be used to discuss other job hazards, prevention methods, and company safety policies.

In 2016, falls from elevation caused 92 of the 115 fatalities in the roofing industry as well as 384 of the 991 overall construction fatalities recorded.  In 2016, falls from elevation were the leading cause of construction worker deaths in the U.S., fatally injuring more than 310 construction workers seriously injuring another 10,350 by falls from elevation. In 2016, the main causes of these construction related fall fatalities were falls from roofs (124), ladders (104), and scaffolds (60). Eighty one percent of deaths from roofs occur in the construction industry, 57% of deaths from ladders occur in the construction industry, and 86% of deaths from scaffolds occur in the construction industry.

Several of the top 10 most frequently cited OSHA violations every year involve fall-protection safety standards. Annual number of construction fatalities in the United States are listed in the table below:

The program was originally launched as a two-year project on Workers Memorial Day in 2012 to raise awareness about preventing falls in construction, but due to its success, it has been continued at the start of every construction season. In 2015, over 150 public events were held across the country, with over 150,000 workers and 1.5 million US Air Force personnel participating.

Organizations partnering with OSHA to sponsor this annual event include the National Institute for Occupational Safety and Health (NIOSH), the Center for Construction Research and Training (CPWR), the American Society of Safety Professionals (ASSP), the National Safety Council, and many others. Resources to assist employers in finding activities are also available from multiple sources. The National Association of Home Builders (NAHB) and NIOSH have made several fall-prevention videos available to the public on YouTube, and the National Roofing Contractors Association has published three video webinars available for viewing.

The Lergent Developers has published a mobile app available for download, which helps workers to find authorized fall prevention course provider.

Personal protective equipment 

Hard hats, steel-toe boots and reflective safety vests are perhaps the most common personal protective equipment worn by construction workers around the world. A risk assessment may deem that other protective equipment is appropriate, such as gloves, goggles, or high-visibility clothing.

Hazards and hazard controls for non-workers
Many construction sites cannot completely exclude non-workers. Road construction sites must often allow traffic to pass through. This places non-workers at some degree of risk.

Road construction sites are blocked off and traffic is redirected. The sites and vehicles are protected by signs and barricades. However, sometimes even these signs and barricades can be a hazard to vehicle traffic. For example, improperly designed barricades can cause cars that strike them to roll over or even be thrown into the air. Even a simple safety sign can penetrate the windshield or roof of a car if it strikes from certain angles.

The majority of deaths in construction are caused by hazards relating to construction activity. However, many deaths are also caused by non construction activities, such as electrical hazards.

Construction safety research in academia
Construction safety has been considered as a hot topic in academic research. As per the latest research. the largest number of published construction safety documents were published by scholars from the US and China; the total number of published articles by these two countries was 1,125, at 56% of the 2000 articles that were published. Both countries showed high levels of research collaboration. While the results suggest that economic development may drive academic construction safety research, there has been an increase in construction safety research conducted by developing countries in recent years, probably due to an improvement in their economic development. While authors’ keywords evidenced the popularity of research on safety management and climate, the network analysis on all keywords, i.e. keywords given by Web of Science and authors, suggest that construction safety research focused on three areas: construction safety management, the relationship between people and construction safety, and the protection and health of workers’ impact on construction safety. There is a new interdisciplinary research trend where construction safety combines with digital technologies, with the largest number involving deep learning. Other trends focus on machine learning, Building Information Modelling, machine learning and visualisation.

Regulation

European Union 
In Europe, the European Agency for Safety and Health at Work coordinates actions at the EU and national levels and the Directorate-General for Employment, Social Affairs and Inclusion is responsible for regulation at the EU level.

Under European Union Law, there are European Union Directives in place to protect workers, notably Directive 89/391 (the Framework Directive) and Directive 92/57 (the Temporary and Mobile Sites Directive). This legislation is transposed into the Member States and places requirements on employers (and others) to assess and protect workers health and safety.

United Kingdom
In the United Kingdom, the Health and Safety Executive (HSE) is responsible for standards enforcement, while in Northern Ireland, the Health and Safety Executive for Northern Ireland (HSENI) is responsible. In Ireland, the Health and Safety Authority (HSA) is responsible for standards and enforcement.

United States
In the United States, the Occupational Safety and Health Administration (OSHA) sets and enforces standards concerning workplace safety and health. Efforts have been made in the first decade of the 21st century to improve safety for both road workers and drivers in construction zones. In 2004, Title 23 Part 630 Subpart J of the Code of Federal Regulations was updated by Congress to include new regulations that direct state agencies to systematically create and adopt comprehensive plans to address safety in road construction zones that receive federal funding.

OSHA implemented the Final Rule to Improve Tracking of Workplace Injuries and Illnesses, which went into effect January 1, 2017. It requires employers to submit incident data electronically to OSHA. This data will enable OSHA to use enforcement and compliance assistance resources more efficiently. The amount of data required varies by company and industry.

According to the latest statistics from OSHA, there are more than 13 job-related deaths each day in the U.S. with one in five of these being in the construction industry.

Hong Kong 
In deciding the risk precautions, the employer has to provide different degrees of protection. Where one task happens to be more dangerous than another, a greater degree of care has to be taken, but where the employer cannot eliminate the dangerous task, reasonable precautions are needed to reduce the risk according to Nguyen Van Vinh v Cheung Ying Construction Engineering Ltd (2008). This does not, however, imply that an employer is required to remove every risk. The Lord Oaksey commented in Winter v Cardiff Rural District Council (1950) stated that “but this does not mean that an employer must decide on every detail of the system of work or mode of operation. There is a sphere in which the employer must exercise his discretion and there are other spheres in which foremen and workmen must exercise theirs....With regard to the decision how safety precaution has to be taken frequently, it should be left to the foreman or workmen on the site. Whilst the immediate employer of the employee is liable for safety, Morris v. Breaveglen (1993) ruled that the principal contractor cannot escape from his liability. The general employers argued that they should not be liable for the injuries as they were not exercising direct control over the workers. However, judges invalidated such contention in Rainfield Design & Associates Ltd v Siu Chi Moon (2000), “[t]he purpose of the Regulations was clearly to provide for the safety of workman and the primary responsibility for this must rest with the contractor responsible for the site. Even where a subcontractor had a contractual duty to provide plant and equipment, the contractor responsible for the site would not be relieved from its duty under the Regulations.”

Construction safety informatics and the role of artificial intelligence on construction safety
Li (2019) proposes that there are three generations of construction safety informatics which are relevant to construction safety enhancement:
The first generation of construction safety informatics consisted of technologies that relied completely on control by human beings; for example, structural equation modelling requires the work of an analyst.
The second generation of construction safety informatics included smart features such as the Internet of Things which can send information to human operators, without human intervention — from sensors, etc. Yet, these “smart” tools cannot learn and improve on their own capabilities.
The third generation of construction safety informatics uses state-of-the-art AI, to mimic human behavior and think, act, learn and improve on its own decision making. All that is required is that the relevant information is fed to these systems, so that they can be ‘taught’.

See also

References

Further reading

External links
National Institute for Occupational Safety and Health - Construction
Health and Safety Executive - Construction
COVID-19 Resources
CDC Guidelines for Construction Workers
OSHA COVID-19 Control and Prevention
CPWR COVID-19 Construction Clearinghouse
COVID-19 Disproportionate Impact Across Racial Lines
American Society of Safety Engineers COVID-19 Challenges
Pan American Health Organization COVID-19 Prevention Measures at Construction Sites
How Covid-19 Effects on Businesses

Construction safety